Giovanni Bolzoni (born November 27, 1905 in Milan) was an Italian professional football player.

Honours
 Serie A champion: 1929/30.

1905 births
Year of death missing
Italian footballers
Serie A players
A.C. Milan players
Parma Calcio 1913 players
Inter Milan players
F.C. Pavia players
A.C. Monza players
Association football defenders